A CCFL inverter is an electrical inverter that supplies alternating current power to a cold cathode fluorescent lamp (CCFL). CCFLs are often used as inexpensive light units in electrical devices that are powered by direct current sources such as batteries.  CCFL inverters are small, have switchover efficiency over 80%, and offer adjustable output of light.  They are widely used for backlights for LCDs, or for rear lighting in advertising signs.

History
As for the inverter circuit of a cold cathode fluorescent lamp, a resonance type circuit has been widely used. This is sometimes referred to as the "Royer circuit". However the proper definition of the Royer circuit requires that the inversion of a switching operation be performed in a state in which the transformer is saturated. An inverter circuit which performs the inversion operation by utilizing resonance in the collector circuit of a transistor is preferably referred to as the "Baxandall converter" in distinction from a true Royer circuit. The multilevel inverters are basically classified into three topologies namely, the flying capacitor inverter, the diode clamped inverter and the cascaded H-bridge inverter. All the topologies have same property of reducing the harmonics. The cascaded has the disadvantage to need separate DC sources but circuit layout is compact and voltage sharing problem is absent.

The early designs of an inverter circuit for a cold cathode fluorescent lamp did not utilize the resonance method of a secondary circuit at all. Instead the so-called closed magnetic circuit type transformer having a small leakage inductance was used as a step-up transformer. The leakage inductance was such that it reduced the output voltage on the secondary side of the transformer. Since this was not desirable, it had to be made as small as possible.

See also 
 Magnetic phase synchronous coupling
 Short-circuit inductance
 Resonant transformer
 Tesla coil

External links
 Jim Williams, "A fourth generation of LCD backlight technology: Component and measurement improvements refine performance", Linear Technology Application Note 65, November 1995.

References

Inverters